Branson Public Schools is the unified school district covering Branson, Missouri. The district has 4,789 students in grades PreK-12th grade, with a student-to-teacher ratio of 15:1 throughout the district.

Branson High School

Branson High School is a public high school in Branson, Missouri. Its the only high school in the district. BHS is the 55th largest high school in Missouri by student enrollment. Serving 1,448 students, Branson High School is the largest high school in Taney County.

The Old Building 
The current Branson High School was built in 2002, as a replacement to the old High School building, which is now used as the Branson Junior High, which teaches grades 7-8. The Junior High was built in 1974, and was the first building that was built for the district.

References

External links
 Branson Public Schools, official site.

Public high schools in Missouri
Schools in Taney County, Missouri